Prosoplus assimilis is a species of beetle in the family Cerambycidae. It was described by Xavier Montrouzier in 1855.

References

Prosoplus
Beetles described in 1855